Svetoslav Hristov Malinov (born 19 January 1968 in Dupnitsa) is a Bulgarian politician and Member of the European Parliament (MEP). He is a member of Democrats for a Strong Bulgaria, part of the European People's Party, and became an MEP on 1 December 2011.

References 

Living people
1968 births
People from Dupnitsa
Democrats for a Strong Bulgaria MEPs
MEPs for Bulgaria 2009–2014
MEPs for Bulgaria 2014–2019